Patricia Littlechild (born 1965) is a Scottish sport shooter and neurosurgeon.

Littlechild competed at the 1994 Commonwealth Games where she won a silver medal in the 50m rifle prone pairs event alongside Shirley McIntosh and a bronze medal in the 50m  rifle prone individual event.

She now works in Glasgow as a neurosurgeon.

References

1965 births
Living people
Scottish female sport shooters
Scottish neurosurgeons
Women surgeons
Shooters at the 2010 Commonwealth Games
Commonwealth Games silver medallists for Scotland
Commonwealth Games bronze medallists for Scotland
Commonwealth Games medallists in shooting
British female sport shooters
Medallists at the 1994 Commonwealth Games